Elena Anatolyevna Garanina (born 19 October 1956) is a former ice dancer who represented the Soviet Union. With Igor Zavozin, she is the 1978 Nebelhorn Trophy and 1981 Winter Universiade champion. They never made it to the World Figure Skating Championships due to the depth of the Soviet dance field. After turning pro, the duo performed in Jayne Torvill and Christopher Dean's ice shows.

Garanina currently works as a coach. Her students have included:
 Morgan Matthews / Maxim Zavozin
 Katherine Copely / Deividas Stagniūnas
 Kayla Nicole Frey / Deividas Stagniūnas

Garanina was formerly married to Igor Zavozin. Their son, ice dancer Maxim Zavozin, was born on 2 March 1985 in Moscow. Garanina's second husband, Valery Spiridonov, competed in pairs. She gave birth to their son, Anton Spiridonov, on 5 August 1998 in the United States.

Competitive highlights 
(with Igor Zavozin)

References 

Living people
Soviet female ice dancers
Russian female ice dancers
Russian figure skating coaches
1956 births
Figure skaters from Moscow
Universiade medalists in figure skating
Universiade gold medalists for the Soviet Union
Competitors at the 1981 Winter Universiade